The Ministry of Administrative Development is the ministry of the Syrian government.

History
The Ministry was established by Legislative Decree No. 39 of 2014. It has been managed by Dr. Salam Safaf since March 29, 2017.

Organisation

Centers 
Administrative Support and Measurement Center
HR Service Center in governorates
State Leaders Center

Central departments 

Communication and Executive Support Department
Quality Control Department
Institutional organization management
Human Resource Management
Reliability and Licensing Department
Functional Legislation Management
Management simplification of procedures
Administrative development directorates in the governorates

Responsibilies
The ministry is responsible for cooperation and coordination with the public and concerned authorities, undertakes the review and study of the laws regulating the public job and proposing its development to ensure the improvement of its performance and the quality of its services.

Ministers

References

Government ministers of Syria
Government ministries of Syria
Cabinet of Syria
Lists of political office-holders in Syria
2014 establishments in Syria
All stub articles
Ministries established in 2014